Daria Vladimirovna Kondakova (born 30 July 1991) is a Russian retired individual rhythmic gymnast. She is a three-time (2011, 2010, 2009) World all-around silver medalist, the 2010 European all-around silver medalist and two time (2010, 2009) Grand Prix Final all-around silver medalist. She was coached by Anna Shumilova. She now works as a rhythmic gymnastics coach and choreographer.

Career 
As a junior, Kondakova won gold in all-around at the 2006 Holon Junior Grand Prix and Calais International tournament. She also won gold at the 2006 European Junior Championships in ribbon as well as the junior team event. She briefly competed as a part of the Russian national group until 2008.

Kondakova's individual breakthrough came in 2009 when she won the all around silver medal at the Worlds Championships in Mie just behind teammate and 2008 Olympic champion Evgenia Kanaeva. She is a three-time World Championship silver medalist in all-around for three consecutive years, having won the silver medal in four individual apparatus in clubs, hoop, ribbon and ball. In 2010, Kondakova repeated her success as the all-around silver medalist for World Cup events in Pesaro and Portimao as well as in Grand Prix and international tournaments. At the 2011 World Championships in Montpellier, France, she won the silver medal in the all-around and in all four individual apparatus, 0.05 points behind Kanaeva.

2012 season and injury 
In 2012, Kondakova opted to participate at the London test qualifications for the 2012 Summer Olympics, winning the qualifications event. At the World Cup event in Penza, she won gold in ball apparatus as well as the all around. In Sofia and Pesaro, she won the silver medal in all-around behind Evgenia Kanaeva. Kondakova sustained a knee injury and was replaced by Alexandra Merkulova at the 2012 European Championships. At the 2012 Moscow Grand Prix, she won the all-around competition.

Irina Viner, the Russian head coach and President of the Russian Federation of Rhythmic Gymnastics, said the issue of participation in the Olympics remained open and would be resolved only after the June Grand Prix in Austria and the World Cup in Belarus in July. Kondakova underwent minor surgery for her knee in Germany. A conference in June 2012 by Irina Viner she said that a relapse of an old Anterior cruciate ligament (ACL) injury prevented Kondakova from competing: "Only a miracle could help Kondakova to recover in time for Olympic Games. We are now trying all possible ways for Kondakova to recover. She is not ready to compete at the World Cup. She will continue training after the World Cup (in Minsk) but it's not certain if it will be enough preparation up to August 9." Viner said that Alexandra Merkulova and Daria Dmitrieva would compete for the second Olympic berth.

Post-Retirement and Coaching career 
Kondakova retired from rhythmic gymnastics shortly after her knee surgery. Her coach Anna Shumilova said “She had a very serious injury, the recovery from which takes about half a year, It’s too late to start all over again.” 

Kondakova has begun working as coach following her retirement, as well as choreographing for routines and music. She is coaching Iuliia Bravikova.

her past students/clients have included:
 Patricia Bezzoubenko
 Maria Titova
 Victoria Veinberg Filanovsky

Personal life 
Kondakova was born in Sochi, Russia.

Routine music information

References

External links 
 
 Daria Kondakova at r-gymnastics.com 
 

1991 births
Living people
Russian rhythmic gymnasts
Sportspeople from Sochi
Russian gymnastics coaches
Medalists at the Rhythmic Gymnastics World Championships
Universiade medalists in gymnastics
Universiade bronze medalists for Russia
Medalists at the 2009 Summer Universiade
21st-century Russian women